Daphne gemmata is a shrub, of the family Thymelaeaceae.  It is native to China, specifically Sichuan and Yunnan.

Description
The shrub is normally deciduous, and grows from 0.3 to 1.0 meters tall.  Its yellowish brown or purplish branches are broom-like. It is often found on cliffs and dry sunny banks at altitudes of 400 to 1500 meters.

References

gemmata